Xiangzhou County is a county of Guangxi, China. It is under the administration of the prefecture-level city of Laibin.

Climate

References

Counties of Guangxi
Laibin